Poly(p-phenylene) (PPP) is made of repeating p-phenylene units, which act as the precursor to a conducting polymer of the rigid-rod polymer family. The synthesis of PPP has proven challenging, but has been accomplished through excess polycondensation with the Suzuki coupling method.

Early efforts typically produced black, insoluble powders that were difficult to characterize. For example, a 1962 paper reports "The solid glowed red-hot in a Bunsen flame, with no evidence of flame formation, and disappeared only slowly." (J. Polym. Sci. (1960), 47, 45) Initially, the chemical and thermal stability of the material drove interest in its synthesis. It was used in rocket nozzles and some fabrics requiring high thermal stability.

Oxidation or the use of dopants is used to convert the non-conductive form to a semiconductor.

References

External links
 Rigid-rod polymer host

Polymer chemistry